Charles Matthews (October 15, 1856 – December 12, 1932) was a Republican member of the U.S. House of Representatives from Pennsylvania.

Biography
Charles Matthews was born in New Castle, Pennsylvania on October 15, 1856, and was employed by a rolling mill as a roll turner while attending night school.

A delegate to the Republican State convention in 1886, he was a member of the city council from 1887 to 1893, and sheriff of Lawrence County, Pennsylvania, from 1897 to 1900.

He was then engaged in manufacturing and banking.

Elected as a Republican to the Sixty-second Congress, he was an unsuccessful candidate for reelection in 1912, and resumed his work in banking.

A delegate to the 1916 Republican National Convention in Chicago, he was appointed county commissioner of Lawrence County on November 26, 1924, and served until January 2, 1928.

Death and interment
Matthews died in New Castle on December 12, 1932, and was interred in the Graceland Cemetery.

References

1856 births
1932 deaths
American bankers
Pennsylvania city council members
Republican Party members of the United States House of Representatives from Pennsylvania
Lawrence County Commissioners (Pennsylvania)